The 1993 Cincinnati Bengals season was the team's 26th year in professional football and its 24th with the National Football League. The David Klingler experiment at starting quarterback got off to a poor start, as the Bengals lost their first ten games for the second of three 0–8 starts in four seasons.

The Bengals would finally get their first win against the Los Angeles Raiders 16–10, at Riverfront Stadium, but were the last winless team for the first of two consecutive years. This ignominy would not be suffered subsequently by any NFL franchise until division rivals the Cleveland Browns went 1–31 in 2016 and 2017. After dropping their next two games, the Bengals closed the season by winning twice before losing their closer to a disappointing Saints outfit to finish with their second 3–13 season in three years.

The late-season win over the Raiders was their first win against a team that finished with a winning record since the 1990-91 AFC Wild Card win over the Oilers (41-14, January 6, 1991). This was the only such regular-season win from 1991-1994 and would be the last such win until week 1 of 1995 (Indianapolis). The win was one of only four against teams with winning records in head coach David Shula's tenure with the team.

Offseason 
 March 17, 1993: The Cincinnati Bengals traded Boomer Esiason to the New York Jets.

NFL Draft

Personnel

Staff

Roster

Regular season

Schedule

Standings

Team leaders

Passing

Rushing

Receiving

Defensive

Kicking and punting

Special teams

Awards and records 
 Against the New England Patriots in Week 15, the Bengals became the first NFL team since the Minnesota Vikings against the Detroit Lions in Week 14 of 1983, to score only a safety in a game. The next occurrence in the regular season was in the opening week of the 2013 Jacksonville Jaguars season against the Chiefs (the Atlanta Falcons were limited to a safety by the New York Giants in a 2011 NFC wild card playoff game).

References

External links 
 1993 Cincinnati Bengals at Pro-Football-Reference.com

Cincinnati Bengals
Cincinnati Bengals seasons
Cincin